In logic, the term statement is variously understood to mean either: 
a meaningful declarative sentence that is true or false, or
a proposition. Which is the assertion that is made by (i.e., the meaning of) a true or false declarative sentence.
In the latter case, a statement is distinct from a sentence in that a sentence is only one formulation of a statement, whereas there may be many other formulations expressing the same statement.

By a statement, I mean "that which one states", not one's stating of it. There are many interpretations of what the term statement means, but generally, it indicates either a meaningful declarative sentence that is either true or false (bivalence). A proposition is an assertion that is made by (i.e., the meaning of) a true or false declarative sentence. A proposition is what a statement means, it is the notion or idea that a statement expresses, i.e., what it represents. It could be said that "2 + 2 = 4" and "two plus two equals four" are two different statements that are expressing the same proposition in two different ways.

Overview
Philosopher of language Peter Strawson advocated the use of the term "statement" in sense (b) in preference to proposition.  Strawson used the term "Statement" to make the point that two declarative sentences can make the same statement if they say the same thing in different ways.  Thus, in the usage advocated by Strawson, "All men are mortal." and "Every man is mortal." are two different sentences that make the same statement.

In either case, a statement is viewed as a truth bearer.

Examples of sentences that are (or make) true statements:

"Socrates is a man."
"A triangle has three sides."
"Madrid is the capital of Spain."

Examples of sentences that are also statements, even though they aren't true:

"All toasters are made of solid gold."
"Two plus two equals five."

Examples of sentences that are not (or do not make) statements:
 
"Who are you?"
"Run!"
"Greenness perambulates."
"I had one grunch but the eggplant over there."
"King Charles III is wise."
"Broccoli tastes good."
"Pegasus exists."

The first two examples are not declarative sentences and therefore are not (or do not make) statements.
The third and fourth are declarative sentences but, lacking meaning, are neither true nor false and therefore are not (or do not make) statements.  The fifth and sixth examples are meaningful declarative sentences, but are not statements but rather matters of opinion or taste.  Whether or not the sentence "Pegasus exists." is a statement is a subject of debate among philosophers.  Bertrand Russell held that it is a (false) statement.  Strawson held it is not a statement at all.

As an abstract entity 
In some treatments, "statement" is introduced in order to distinguish a sentence from its informational content. A statement is regarded as the information content of an information-bearing sentence. Thus, a sentence is related to the statement it bears like a numeral to the number it refers to. Statements are abstract logical entities, while sentences are grammatical entities.

See also 
 Belief
 Claim (logic)
 Concept
 Sentence (mathematical logic)
 Truthbearer - statements

Notes

References 
A. G. Hamilton, Logic for Mathematicians, Cambridge University Press, 1980, .
 
 
 
 Peter Millican, "Statements and Modality:  Strawson, Quine and Wolfram"
 P. F. Strawson, "On Referring" in Mind, Vol 59 No 235 (Jul 1950)

Concepts in logic